The Apostles are an English experimental punk rock band, who developed within the confines of the 1980s anarcho-punk scene in the UK, but did not necessarily adhere to the aesthetics of that movement.

History
The Apostles were formed in the Islington area of London in 1979 by William 'Bill' Corbett (vocals), Julian Portinari (bass), Dan McIntyre (drums) and Pete Byng-Hall (guitar). This line-up of the group did not play any concerts, and only appeared in a small number of fanzines (including Paroxysm Fear and New Crimes) before Bill Corbett left the group.

Andy Martin joined as vocalist in summer 1981, and the group played their first concert on 22 September 1981. This line-up of the group then recorded an eponymous demo tape later that year.

The music of the group is generally characterised by a varied eclecticism which encompasses punk and blues rock, with influences like Lemon Kittens, Five Or Six, and other avant-garde groups.

The remaining founder members of the group left the group in early 1982. Martin recruited Dave Fanning (ex-Innocent Bystander) as bass player, along with a revolving line-up of musicians – including John Soares, Kev Apostle, Flump, Chris Low (ex-Political Asylum) and Olly Bucket (Eat Shit) – to continue the group, who went on to play numerous concerts in the London area, and to record 8 demo cassettes and 4 7" singles between 1982 and 1984.

Andy Martin and Dave Fanning were joined in 1984 by Malcolm "Scruff" Lewty (later of Hellbastard, Sidewinder, Nero Circus and Heavy Water) and drummer Chris "Widni" Wiltshire which created a line-up which remained relatively stable (with the addition of Sean Stokes and Colin Murrell) until the group's demise at the end of the 1980s. The group recorded over 10 demo cassettes, 4 7" singles and 7 12" LP's between mid-1984 and 1990. Original guitarist Pete Bynghall re-joined the group in late 1988 for their last recordings and final concert (cf Live at the academy).

Always highly critical of the seemingly inward looking anarchist movement of the times, the autonomous and extreme libertarian approach of The Apostles seemed to portray classic anarchism, as opposed to the conformity of many of their contemporaries. This led the group receiving respect from notable members of the anarcho-punk movement such as Conflict, who released three records by The Apostles, and Crass with whom the band co-operated during the squatting of the Zig-Zag Club and during the time in which The Autonomy Centre and Centro Iberico anarchist venues operated. Both Martin and Fanning worked during this period at the Little @ printers – an anarchist printers located in the same building as the Autonomy Centre in Wapping. The Autonomy Centre was founded with proceeds from the Crass "Bloody Revolutions" single in 1980 where Martin was a keyholder prior to joining The Apostles.

The anti-communist and anti-gay lyrics of 'Rock Against Communism' and 'Kill or Cure' on the 'Giving of Loving Costs Nothing' EP and other similarly themed later songs opened the group to charges of fascism and homophobia. Whilst this material was intended to expose the supine attitudes of those within the 'anarcho punk' milieu who did not challenge such blatantly provocative sentiments (a tactic which Andy Martin had used since his entrance to the group), they undermined the coherence of the band's ideology, leading Stewart Home, in his book Cranked Up Really High, to describe The Apostles as "locked into...a stasis if not actual paralysis".

During the time the band was together Andy Martin began to write about his homosexuality and the subject in general which alienated many of their former fans but did not deter Martin. In 1989, Martin and Fannig gave an interview with Homocore fanzine which addressed this issue. Among their many recordings released, The Apostles contributed the song "Forbidden Love" to the first queercore compilation, JD.s Top Ten Homocore Hits, released by J.D.s  fanzine in 1990.

The Apostles split as a group in 1990, immediately forming Academy 23 which also included Nathan Coles (of The Unbelievables) and Lawrence Burton (formerly of Konstruktivists). The group collaborated with the industrial band The Grey Wolves on two songs, "Terror Chamber" and "Terror Intensifies", both featured on compilations. Academy 23 were renamed in 1994 as Unit.

Discography

Albums
Live at the LMC, Jan 1983 (Split live LP with The Mob) bootleg
Punk Obituary, 1985, Mortarhate Records (reissued in 2014)
The Lives & Times of the Apostles, 1986, COR Records
The Acts of the Apostles in the Theatre Of Fear, 1986, Acid Stings
How Much Longer?, 1986, Acid Stings
Equinox Screams, 1987
Cartography / The Show Trial Asylum, 1987 (Split cassette with The Demolition Company)
The Other Operation, 1988, split album with Statement (Patrick Poole)
Hymn To Pan, 1988 (only available in America)
Eine Antwort / Dipinti Sotterranei, 1988 (Split cassette with F.A.R. (Final Alternative Relation); The Apostles' side on the album is "Eine Antwort")

EPs
Chart placings shown are from the UK Independent Chart.
Blow It Up, Burn It Down, Kick It Till It Breaks!, 1982
Rising From The Ashes, 1983 No. 21
The Curse of the Creature, 1983 No. 17
The Giving Of Love Costs Nothing, 1984
Smash The Spectacle, 1984 No. 22
Anathema/The Apostles, 1985
Death To Wacky Pop!, 1986 (features members of The Joy Of Living)
No Faith No Fear, 1986

The Joy Of Living were a female folk/punk band who released one cassette demo in addition to the above recording.

Compilations
Segments (cassette compiled of studio material; the release date is unknown)
The Acts of the Apostles 1985 (cassette compiled of live material; not to be confused with the 1986 album with the similar name)
Final Manifesto 1992 (cassette compiled of the band's last and unreleased studio recording sessions from March 1988 and January 1989)
No Faith No Fear 1993 (cassette compiled of recordings of an unreleased double album the band recorded in 1986; rereleased in 2006 in CD-R format with two bonus tracks)
The Singles & Compilation Album Tracks 2018 (digital collection compiled of EP material and tracks which appeared on various VA compilations; available on Unit's Bandcamp page)
The 1st & 2nd Studio Albums 2018 (digital collection compiled of the albums "Punk Obituary" and "The Lives And Times Of The Apostles"; available on Unit's Bandcamp page)
 The 3rd & 4th Albums 2018 (digital collection compiled of the albums "The Acts Of The Apostles In The Theatre Of Fear" and "How Much Longer?"; available on Unit's Bandcamp page)
The 5th & 6th Albums 2018 (digital collection compiled of the album "Eine Antwort" and the "Final Manifesto" compilation cassette; available on Unit's Bandcamp page)
Make Up 2019 (digital collection compiled of material for a cassette the band recorded in April 1988 called by the names "Grant Munro & The Apostles" and "Make Up", which was believed to be lost for 27 years; available on Unit's Bandcamp page)
Cassette Chaos 2020 (digital collection compiled of four different recording sessions from the years 1983, 1987 and 1989; available on Unit's Bandcamp page)

Demo albums (cassette only)
The Apostles   1981
The 2nd Dark Age   1982
Libertarian Propaganda   1982
Topics For Discussion   1982
A Sudden Surge of Sound (retrospective on CFC Cassettes) 1983
Swimmers in the Sea Of Life   1983
Live at the Recession Club   1983
Christ, Its The Apostles!  1983
Will I Ever Be Free?   1984
Fire in the Sky   1985
Visions of the End   1985
Punk Leftovers   1986
Private Performances   1987
Gary Cooke Was Here   1987
Strength Through Purity  1987
A.S.P.A. Demo  1987
Une Réponse  1987
Fine Antwort  1988
The Progressive Blues Experiment   1988
The 12th Gate to the Underworld 1988
Death   1988
How To Suck Seed   1988
Life   1989
A Consumer Commodity  1989
Live at the Academy  1989 (the last ever performance 23/02/89)

Tracks on various artists compilation albums
Mob Violence (Part 2) – "We Don't Want Your Fucking War" 1986 LP Mortarhate
'Inner Space – "God Save Us From The USA" 1987 LP, Happy MikeWalls – "You've Heard It All Before" (Crass Covers compilation) 1993 LP Ruptured Ambitions RecordsHyde Park  1988 LP (released by German band Doc Wör Mirran featuring international groups, not all punk)J.D.s Top Ten Tape – "Forbidden Love" 1990 cassette

Several early Apostles tracks are featured on the Cause For Concern compilation A Sudden Surge of Power''. A sampler of the early 1980s post-punk industrial music scene, it also featured contributions from Nocturnal Emissions, Test Department, Attrition, 400 Blows, We Be Echo and ex-Throbbing Gristle members Chris and Cosey.

References

External links
Website for The Apostles' current band UNIT
Website for The Apostles
 Article about The Apostles
The Apostles interview with Homocore zine

Cassette culture 1970s–1990s
Anarcho-punk groups
English punk rock groups
Queercore groups
British hardcore punk groups
Musical groups from London
Underground punk scene in the United Kingdom